"Trouble Town" is a song by British singer songwriter Jake Bugg. It was released as the lead single from his eponymous debut album (2012). It was released as a digital download in the United Kingdom on 4 March 2012 and charted in Belgium.

"Trouble Town" is the opening theme for the BBC TV series Happy Valley broadcast between 2014 and 2023.

Music video
A music video to accompany the release of "Trouble Town" was first released onto YouTube on 27 January 2012. By January 2022 it had received over 3.6 million hits

The video was shot in Bugg's hometown of Clifton, Nottingham, mixing HD footage with Super 8, and was directed by Michael Holyk, who also directed the video for "Lightning Bolt".

Track listings

Chart performance

Weekly charts

Release history

References

2012 debut singles
2012 songs
Jake Bugg songs
Songs written by Jake Bugg
Songs written by Iain Archer
Television drama theme songs